Royal Glint (1970–1976) was an American Thoroughbred racehorse.

Background
Royal Glint was a bay gelding bred by Claiborne Farm of Paris, Kentucky. He was sired by U.S. Racing Hall of Fame inductee Round Table and was out of the mare Regal Gleam, the 1966 American Champion Two-Year-Old Filly. Damsire Hail To Reason was the 1960 American Champion Two-Year-Old Colt and the Leading sire in North America in 1970.

Royal Glint was purchased by Arkansas businessman Dan Lasater, who entrusted his race conditioning to Jere Smith, Sr.

Racing career
A winner at age three and four, at age five in 1975 he was transferred to Lasater's East Coast trainer Gordon Potter.

He won five important graded stakes races on both dirt and grass including the 1975 San Bernardino Handicap, in which he equaled the track record for a mile and an eight on grass. In 1976, Royal Glint added another five stakes races to his credit, including California's richest race and most prestigious event for older horses, the Santa Anita Handicap.

Final race and death
While leading in the August 21, 1976, Michigan Mile Handicap at Detroit Race Course, Royal Glint suffered a career-ending leg injury that, despite efforts by veterinarians, eventually led to him being euthanized. He was buried at Longfield Farm near Goshen, Kentucky.
Royal Glint was the 19th Thoroughbred in racing history to earn more than $1 million.

Pedigree

References

 Royal Glint's pedigree and partial racing stats

1970 racehorse births
1976 racehorse deaths
Racehorses bred in Kentucky
Racehorses trained in the United States
Thoroughbred family 1-x